Glutamine-dependent NAD(+) synthetase is an enzyme that in humans is encoded by the NADSYN1 gene.

Nicotinamide adenine dinucleotide (NAD) is a coenzyme in metabolic redox reactions, a precursor for several cell signaling molecules, and a substrate for protein posttranslational modifications. NAD synthetase (EC 6.3.5.1) catalyzes the final step in the biosynthesis of NAD from nicotinic acid adenine dinucleotide (NaAD).

References

Further reading

Human proteins